East Meath is an area of made up of the electoral divisions of St Mary's (Part) and Julianstown in County Meath. The area is bound on the north by the River Boyne and County Louth, to the south just beyond the River Nanny close to the County Dublin border, to the east by the Irish Sea and to the west by the M1. It has been part of the Dáil constituency of Louth since 2007.

Geography

Urban areas
Bettystown
Donacarney
Drogheda South
Julianstown
Laytown
Mornington

Electoral divisions
Julianstown
St. Mary's (Part)

Demographics
The area is characterised by a series of densely populated urban areas which stretch across Meath's 12 km coastline and mesh into one another. With a population of 22,909 according to the 2016 census, and an area of 82 km2, East Meath accounts for roughly 3.5% of the area and 11.7% of the population of County Meath. The largest centre of population is the census town of Laytown-Bettystown-Mornington which had a population of 11,872 recorded in 2016.

Defined area
The Report on Dáil and European Parliament Constituencies 2007 recommended "that Louth should become a 5-seat constituency by extending the constituency southwards from, and in the environs of, Drogheda and taking in electoral divisions which have extensive linkages with the town. This will allow the inclusion of the town of Drogheda and hinterland areas in a single constituency."

The Electoral (Amendment) Act 2009 defines the constituency as:
"The county of Louth and, in the county of Meath, the electoral divisions of Julianstown, St. Mary’s (part), in the former Rural District of Meath."

Sport
 St. Colmcille's GAA club serves the area of East Meath encompassing the villages of Laytown, Bettystown, Donacarney and Mornington. Their facilities are located at Páirc Uí Rís in Piltown, Bettystown.
 Laytown and Bettystown Golf Club, Golflinks Road, Bettystown.
 Laytown and Bettystown Lawn Tennis Club, Golflinks Road, Bettystown.
 East Meath United is a youths soccer football club that competes in the AUL, DDSL, DCSL and the NDSL. The football club, which was founded in 1999, plays its home matches at Minnistown Road, Laytown, County Meath. The team's colours are claret, Blue and White.

Transport

Rail
Laytown Train Station serves the area with direct rail links to Dublin Connolly.

Road
East Meath can be reached via Exit 7 (Julianstown, Drogheda South), Exit 8 (Drogheda, Duleek) and Exit 9 (Drogheda Centre, Donore) on the M1 motorway which connects Dublin to Belfast.

East Meath can be reached via the R132 (Previously N1) by joining the R150 north in Drogheda, or R150 south in Julainstown.

Bus
Bus Éireann 190/190A connects Laytown-Drogheda-(Via Slane)-Navan-Trim/Athboy.

Matthews Coach Hire services East Meath with bus services to Dublin. The route serves, City North, Julianstown, Laytown, Bettystown, Donacarney and Drogheda Colpe.

Education

Primary
 Donacarney Boys National School.
 Gaelscoil an Bhradain Feasa, Drogheda.
 Le Cheile Educate Together National School, Drogheda.
 Reált Na Mara  Girls National School, Donacarney.
 Scoil an Spioraid Naomh, Laytown.
 Scoil Oilibhéir Naofa, Laytown. 
 Whitecross National School, Julianstown.

Secondary
 Drogheda Grammar School
 Coláiste na hInse

Churches
 Sacred Heart RC Church, Laytown.
 Star of the Sea RC Church, Mornington.
 St Mary's RC Church, Julianstown.
 St Mary's Church of Ireland, Julianstown
 Drogheda Presbyterian Church, Colpe East, Drogheda.

Ecology
Sonairte is an interactive visitor centre established in 1986 which promotes ecological awareness and sustainable living. Sonairte, The Ninch, Laytown.

Gallery

References

External links
 Official local area plans for East Meath (pdf)
 Local Area Plan for the Southern Environs of Drogheda 2009 - 2015
 Planning Strategy for the Greater Drogheda Area

County Meath
Drogheda